Events from the year 1732 in Scotland.

Incumbents 

 Secretary of State for Scotland: vacant

Law officers 
 Lord Advocate – Duncan Forbes
 Solicitor General for Scotland – John Sinclair, jointly with Charles Erskine

Judiciary 
 Lord President of the Court of Session – Lord North Berwick
 Lord Justice General – Lord Ilay
 Lord Justice Clerk – Lord Grange

Events 
 This year's General Assembly of the Church of Scotland gives rise to the First Secession of 1733.
 Construction of a new Haddo House near Tarves in Aberdeenshire for William Gordon, 2nd Earl of Aberdeen, by William Adam in Georgian Palladian style begins.

Births 
 21 February – William Falconer, poet (lost at sea c.1770)
 21 July – James Adam, architect (died 1794 in England)
 6 October  – John Broadwood, piano maker (died 1812 in England)

Deaths 
 20 May – Thomas Boston, church leader (born 1676)

See also 

 Timeline of Scottish history

References 

 
Years of the 18th century in Scotland
Scotland
1730s in Scotland